Lotta Svärd was a Finnish voluntary auxiliary paramilitary organisation for women. Formed originally in 1918, it had a large membership undertaking volunteer social work in the 1920s and 1930s. It was formed to support the White Guard. During the Second World War, it mobilized to replace men conscripted into the army.  It served in hospitals, at air raid warning positions, and other auxiliary tasks in close cooperation with the army.  The women were officially unarmed except for an antiaircraft battery in 1944. Virtanen argues that, their "accountability to the nation took a masculine and military form in public, but had a private, feminine side to it including features like caring, helping and loving." The organisation was suppressed by the government after the war.

Name 

The name comes from a poem by Johan Ludvig Runeberg. Part of a large and famous book, The Tales of Ensign Stål, the poem described a fictional woman named Lotta Svärd. According to the poem, a Finnish soldier, private Svärd –  means a sword – went to fight in the Finnish War and took his wife, Lotta, along with him. Private Svärd was killed in battle, but his wife remained on the battlefield, taking care of wounded soldiers. The name was first brought up by Marshal Mannerheim in a speech given on 16 May 1918.

History

During the Finnish Civil War it was associated with the White Guard. After the war Lotta Svärd was founded as a separate organisation on 9 September 1920. The first known organisation to use the name Lotta Svärd was the Lotta Svärd of Riihimäki, founded on 11 November 1918.

The organisation expanded during the 1920s and it included 60,000 members in 1930. By 1944 it included 242,000 volunteers, the largest voluntary auxiliary organisation in the world, while the total population of Finland was less than four million.

Inspired by the Finnish Lotta Svärd, a similar organization was founded in Stockholm, Sweden in 1924. The organization, which later took the name Sveriges lottakårer [the Swedish Lotta corps], kept close contact with its Finnish sister-organization.

During the 1920s and 1930s only Christian Finnish citizens were eligible to join, and two references from persons considered reliable were required. The latter requirement was often ignored after the break of Winter War in 1939. Foreigners could be accepted by special permission. However, in 1940 the first Muslim and Jewish members were accepted, and the first non-denominational member in 1941.

World War II

During the Winter War some 100,000 men whose jobs were taken over by "Lottas" were freed for military service. The Lottas worked in hospitals, at air-raid warning posts and other auxiliary tasks in conjunction with the armed forces. The Lottas, however, were officially unarmed. The only exception was a voluntary anti-aircraft battery in Helsinki in summer 1944, composed of Lotta Svärd members. The battery operated the AA search-lights. The unit was issued rifles for self-protection, thus being the only armed female military unit of the Finnish Defence Forces history.

The dire need for labor led to fast recruitment and there was often no time to properly train the new Lottas according to the principles of the organization. In addition, most new recruits were young and inexperienced. This caused some friction between the veterans and the new recruits.

Lotta Svärd suffered relatively light losses, considering the number of women posted to a war zone and the length of the war. During the wars, 291 Lottas died, most of which (140) from diseases caught on duty. 66 were killed on the front, 47 in air raids and 34 in accidents. The fallen Lottas were buried in war heroes' graves in their home parishes.

Postwar

When the Continuation War ended, the Soviet Union demanded the ban of all organisations that it considered to be paramilitary, fascist or semi-fascist. Lotta Svärd was one of the groups that was disbanded, on 23 November 1944. However, a new organisation, Suomen Naisten Huoltosäätiö, was started and took over much of the old property. The organisation still exists by the name of Lotta Svärd Säätiö (Lotta Svärd Foundation).

The Finnish Lotta Svärd organisation has inspired similar organisations in other countries and there is still a Lotta Svärd organisation in Sweden (the Swedish Women's Voluntary Defence Organization ("Lottorna"); the same model is also used in Denmark and Norway.

Popular references

The 2005 film Promise describes the experiences of Finnish Lottas during the Second World War.

A webcomic by Setz released April 23, 2017, "Lotta Svärd: Women of War" details the life of members of the Lotta Svärd during the Winter War.

The Finnish indie pop group Vasas flora och fauna released the album "Släkt med Lotta Svärd" in May 13, 2015.

See also
 Seinäjoki Civil Guard House, now housing the Civil Guard & Lotta Svärd Museum

References

Further reading
 
 Ahlbäck, Anders, and Ville Kivimäki. "Masculinities at war: Finland 1918–1950." NORMA: Nordic Journal For Masculinity Studies 3.2 (2008): 114–131.
 Nevala-Nurmi, Seija-Leena. "Girls and Boys in the Finnish Voluntary Defence Movement." Ennen & nyt (2006): 3.
 Ollila, Anne. "Women's voluntary associations in Finland during the 1920s and 1930s" Scandinavian Journal of History (1995) 20#2 pp: 97–107.
 Olsson, Pia. "To Toil and to Survive: Wartime Memories of Finnish Women," Human Affairs (2002) 12#2 pp 127–138; based on memories of Lotta Svärd veterans. 
 Virtanen, Aila. "Accountability to the nation – The Finnish Lotta Svärd organization." (2010) online

Finnish women in war
Paramilitary organisations based in Finland
Winter War
Continuation War
Military history of Finland during World War II
Women in war 1900–1945
Women in World War II